BTCs or BTCS may refer to: 

 BTCs 
 Bitcoins
 Brachytherapy catheters (for brachytherapy in bladder cancer) 
 BTCS
 Before These Crowded Streets, an album by the Dave Matthews Band

See also
 BTC (disambiguation)